Gordon T. Sandison (February 20, 1919 – October 27, 1989) was an American politician in the state of Washington. He served in the Washington House of Representatives from 1949 to 1959 for district 24, and in the Senate from 1958 to 1977, when he was appointed as director of the Washington Department of Fisheries.

References

1989 deaths
1919 births
Democratic Party Washington (state) state senators
Democratic Party members of the Washington House of Representatives
20th-century American politicians